Virtual leased lines (VLL), also referred to as virtual private wire service (VPWS) or EoMPLS (Ethernet over MPLS), is a way to provide Ethernet-based point to point communication over Multiprotocol Label Switching (MPLS) or Internet Protocol networks. VLL uses the pseudo-wire encapsulation for transporting Ethernet traffic over an MPLS tunnel across an MPLS backbone. VLL also describes a point to point bonded connection using the broadband bonding technology.

Types
There are 5 types of VLLs:

 Epipes: Emulates a point-to-point Ethernet service. VLAN-tagged Ethernet frames are supported. Interworking with other Layer 2 technologies is also supported.
 Apipes: Emulates a point-to-point ATM (Asynchronous Transfer Mode) service. Several subtypes are provided to support different ATM service types.
 Fpipes: Emulates point-to-point Frame Relay circuit. Some features for interworking with ATM are also supported.
 Ipipes: Provides IP interworking capabilities between different Layer 2 technologies.
 Cpipes: Emulates a point-to-point time-division multiplexing (TDM) circuit.

See also
 Virtual Extensible LAN
 Virtual Private LAN Service

References

External links
 Layer 2 Virtual Private Networks (l2vpn) working group homepage
 Pseudo Wire Emulation Edge to Edge (pwe3) working group homepage

MPLS networking
Network protocols